Göteborgs FF is a Swedish football club located in Gothenburg.

Background
Göteborgs Fotbollförening was founded on 20 August 1897 and is located in Gothenburg. The club is two times runners-up in Svenska Mästerskapet (first in 1899 and then in 1903) which decided the Swedish Champions in early Swedish football. The club was considered a feeder club of Örgryte IS, and played their home matches at Walhalla IP which was owned by Örgryte.

The club participated in the two first seasons of Svenska Serien, finishing fifth in 1910, and being excluded after the season, but then being readmitted the next season since two clubs withdrew after only one game. They finished sixth that season, but where excluded once again to never return to a national league again, even though they played in Svenska Mästerskapet after that.

In recent years Göteborgs Fotbollförening has participated mainly in the lower divisions of the Swedish football league system.  The club currently plays in Division 4 Göteborg B which is the sixth tier of Swedish football. They play their home matches at the Majvallen in Gothenburg.

Göteborgs FF are affiliated to the Göteborgs Fotbollförbund. Göteborgs FF have competed in the Svenska Cupen on 23 occasions and have played 74 matches in the competition.

Achievements
 Svenska Mästerskapet:
Runners-up (2): 1899, 1903

Season to season

In the 1940s Göteborgs FF competed in the following divisions:

In recent seasons Göteborgs FF have competed in the following divisions:

Attendances

In recent seasons Göteborgs FF have had the following average attendances:

* League restructuring in 2006 resulted in a new division being created at Tier 3 and subsequent divisions dropping a level.

|}

Footnotes

External links
 Göteborgs FF – Official website

Football clubs in Gothenburg
1897 establishments in Sweden
Football clubs in Västra Götaland County